Santa Ysabel (Spanish for "St. Elizabeth"; Kumeyaay: Ellykwanan), is an unincorporated community in the Santa Ysabel Valley of eastern San Diego County, in southern California.

History
The 1818 Santa Ysabel Asistencia is located here, a Spanish mission asistencia (sub-mission) of Mission San Diego de Alcalá. The town site is within the former Rancho Santa Ysabel, an 1844 Mexican land grant to José Joaquín Ortega and Eduardo Stokes.  In 1878, what began as the town of Santa Ysabel began with a store owned by C. R. Wellington, and grew to include a hotel and a blacksmith.  By June 26, 1889, it had acquired its own post office.

Today

The town is located near the San Diego River, just north of the Cleveland National Forest at the junction of Highway 78 and Highway 79.

Other notable sights of the small town include the famous Dudley's Bakery and the Julian Apple Pie factory. The town serves as a gateway to the mountain areas of San Diego County, including the Laguna Mountains, Julian, and Palomar Mountain.

The ZIP Code is 92070 and the community is inside area codes 442 and 760.

Climate
According to the Köppen Climate Classification system, Santa Ysabel has a warm-summer Mediterranean climate, abbreviated "Csa" on climate maps.

References

Unincorporated communities in San Diego County, California
Unincorporated communities in California